The 2018 Montreal Alouettes season was the 52nd season for the team in the Canadian Football League and their 64th overall. The Alouettes improved upon their disappointing 3–15 record from 2017, but still failed to qualify for the playoffs for the fourth straight season, finishing with a 5–13 record.

This was the first season under former NFL head coach Mike Sherman and the second season under general manager Kavis Reed. The Alouettes hosted their training camp for the first time at Olympic Stadium with rookies reporting on May 16 and main camp beginning on May 20.

Offseason

CFL draft 
The 2018 CFL Draft took place on May 3, 2018. The Alouettes held the first overall draft pick by virtue of finishing in last place in 2017, but traded it to Hamilton in exchange for the second overall pick and several other picks and players. The Alouettes held ten selections in total, after acquiring another fourth-round pick for Andrew Lue and another sixth-round pick for S. J. Green. The Alouettes traded their second-round pick to Saskatchewan for Darian Durant. They also upgraded their fifth-round pick to a third-round pick in the Vernon Adams trade for Tevaughn Campbell.

Preseason

Schedule 

 Games played with white uniforms.

Regular season
In recognition of the Alouettes' storied history, the team featured a different helmet logo, drawn in red and white only, for each of the first three months of the season. Helmets worn in June featured the team logo from 1949 to 1969, July featured the team logo from 1970 to 1973 and August featured the team logo from 1974 to 1986. Helmets worn from Week 14 to the end of the season had the team's then-current logo, from 1996 to 2018.

Standings

Schedule

 Games played with colour uniforms.
 Games played with white uniforms.
 Games played with alternate uniforms.

Team

Roster

Coaching staff

References 

Montreal Alouettes seasons
2018 Canadian Football League season by team
2010s in Montreal
2018 in Quebec